John Watters (July 22, 1903 – August 3, 1962) was an American middle-distance runner. He competed in the men's 800 metres at the 1924 Summer Olympics.  He graduated from Harvard College in 1926.

References

External links
 

1903 births
1962 deaths
Athletes (track and field) at the 1924 Summer Olympics
American male middle-distance runners
Olympic track and field athletes of the United States
Place of birth missing
Harvard Crimson men's track and field athletes